Nahúm Gómez Del Rosal (born 19 January 1998) is a Mexican professional footballer who plays as a midfielder for Club Atlético La Paz.

Career
Ahead of the 2019–20 season, Gómez joined Tlaxcala.

References

External links
 

1998 births
Living people
Association football midfielders
Everton de Viña del Mar footballers
C.F. Pachuca players
Tlaxcala F.C. players
Club Celaya footballers
Tampico Madero F.C. footballers
Chilean Primera División players
Liga MX players
Liga de Expansión MX players
Liga Premier de México players
Tercera División de México players
Mexican expatriate footballers
Mexican expatriate sportspeople in Chile
Expatriate footballers in Chile
Footballers from Hidalgo (state)
People from Huejutla de Reyes
Mexican footballers